

Bernd von Doering (16 January 1903 – 7 July 1944) was a general in the Army of Nazi Germany during World War II.  He was a recipient of the Knight's Cross of the Iron Cross.

Awards and decorations

 Knight's Cross of the Iron Cross on 30 November 1940 as Major and commander of the II./Schützen-Regiment 79

References

Citations

Bibliography

 

1903 births
1944 deaths
Major generals of the German Army (Wehrmacht)
German Army personnel killed in World War II
Nobility in the Nazi Party
Recipients of the Knight's Cross of the Iron Cross
People from Poznań County
People from the Province of Posen
German Army generals of World War II